Wizard Lake is a lake in Alberta, Canada located  south of Calmar. It is a popular recreation spot due to its proximity to Edmonton.

Geography 
Wizard Lake is a relatively small lake. The bottom is mostly rock and has a shallow depth with the average being only . "The Point" is a nickname for the narrowest and most sandy part of the lake which is a good swimming spot.

Amenities 
Wizard Lake is home to Jubilee Campground which has 100 stalls (33 power, 67 Natural) in total. The lake has recently been refitted on the east shore for a public swimming location.

Activities 
Swimming
Fishing
Boating
Camping
Snowmobiling

See also
List of lakes of Alberta

References

Lakes of Alberta
Leduc County